Agonum marginatum is a species of ground beetle in the Platyninae subfamily. It was described by Carl Linnaeus in 1758 and is found throughout Europe, North Africa, Siberia, West Asia, as well as on islands such as Canary, Azores, and Madeira.

References

Beetles described in 1758
Beetles of Asia
Beetles of North Africa
Beetles of Europe
marginatum
Taxa named by Carl Linnaeus